Leslie James Ames (29 August 1912 – 26 November 1998) was an Australian rules footballer who played with Collingwood and Fitzroy in the Victorian Football League (VFL).

Notes

External links 

		
Les Ames's profile at Collingwood Forever

1912 births
1998 deaths
Australian rules footballers from Victoria (Australia)
Collingwood Football Club players
Fitzroy Football Club players
Northcote Football Club players